Year 1401 (MCDI) was a common year starting on Saturday (link will display the full calendar) of the Julian calendar.

Events 
 January–December 
 January 6 – Rupert, King of Germany, is crowned King of the Romans at Cologne.
 March 2 – William Sawtrey, a Lollard, is the first person to be burned at the stake at Smithfield, London.
 March 13 – The Samogitians, supported by Grand Duke Vytautas of Lithuania, rebel against the Teutonic knights and burn two castles. Vytautas is granted increased autonomy by King Jogaila of the Poland–Lithuania union.
 March 17 – Turko-Mongol emperor Timur sacks Damascus.
 June:
 The English Pale in Ireland is reduced to Dublin, County Kildare, County Louth, and County Meath.
 Timur raids the city of Baghdad, in the Jalayirid Empire.
 October 14 – Sultan Nasir-ud-Din Mahmud Shah Tughluq of Delhi is restored to power.

 Date unknown 
 The De heretico comburendo Act is passed in England, as the Archbishop of Canterbury pressures King Henry IV of England into outlawing as heretics the Lollards, followers of John Wycliffe.  Evidence of being a Lollard is having a copy of Wycliffe's translation of the Bible.
 Dilawar Khan establishes the Malwa Sultanate in present-day northern India.
 Emperor Hồ Quý Ly of Dai Ngu (now Vietnam) passes the throne to his son, Hồ Hán Thương.
 A civil war, lasting four years, breaks out in the Majapahit Empire in present-day Indonesia.
 The Joseon dynasty in present-day Korea officially enters into a tributary relationship with Ming dynasty China.
 Japan re-enters into a tributary relationship with China.

Births 
 March 27 – Albert III, Duke of Bavaria-Munich (d. 1460)
 May 10 – Thomas Tuddenham, Landowner (d. 1462)
 May 12 – Emperor Shōkō of Japan (d. 1428)
 July 23 – Francesco I Sforza, Italian condottiero (d. 1466)
 September 14 – Maria of Castile, Queen of Aragon, Queen consort of Aragon and Naples (d. 1458)
 October 27 – Catherine of Valois, queen consort of England from 1420 until 1422 (d. 1437)
 November 26 – Henry Beaufort, 2nd Earl of Somerset (d. 1418)
 December 21 – Tommaso Masaccio, Italian painter (d. 1428)
 date unknown
 Charles I, Duke of Bourbon (d. 1456)
 Jacqueline, Countess of Hainaut (d. 1436)
 probable – Nicholas of Cusa, German philosopher, mathematician and astronomer (d. 1464)

Deaths 
 January 19 – Robert Bealknap, British justice 
 March – William Sawtrey, English Lollard martyr (burned at the stake)
 April 8 or August 8 – Thomas de Beauchamp, 12th Earl of Warwick (b. 1338)
 May 25 – Queen Maria of Sicily (b. 1363)
 September 14 – Dobrogost of Nowy Dwór, Polish bishop (b. 1355)
 October – Anabella Drummond, queen of Scotland
 October 19 – John Charleton, 4th Baron Cherleton (b. 1362)
 October 20 – Klaus Störtebeker, German pirate
 November 25 – King Tarabya of Ava (b. 1368)
 date unknown – Andronikos Asen Zaccaria, Baron of Chalandritsa and Arcadia, Grand Constable of Achaea

References